Horseplay may refer to:
 Horseplay (2003 film), an Australian film
 Horseplay (2014 film), a Hong Kong action comedy film
 Horseplay humor, an aspect of low comedy

See also
 H-O-R-S-E, a variation of basketball